The 2023 Liga 2 season will be the 78th edition of the second tier of Federación Peruana de Futbol. This year's edition will start play in April 2023 and it is scheduled to end in October 2023.

Teams

Fase Regular

Results

Promotion Playoffs

Quarterfinals

First leg

Second leg

Semifinals

First leg

Second leg

Finals

See also
 2023 Liga 1
 2023 Copa Perú
 2023 Ligas Departamentales del Perú
 2023 Torneo de Promoción y Reserva

References

External links
  
Peruvian Segunda División news at Peru.com 
Peruvian Segunda División statistics and news at Dechalaca.com 
Peruvian Segunda División news at SegundaPerú.com 
 RSSSF

2023
2023 in Peruvian football